Lilian Helder (born 30 May 1973 in Venlo) is a Dutch politician and former lawyer. As a member of the Party for Freedom (Partij voor de Vrijheid) she has been an MP since 17 June 2010. She focuses on matters of the judiciary.

Helder worked at the municipality of Helden and for several law firms. She studied law at Radboud University Nijmegen.

References 
  Parlement.com biography

External links 
  House of Representatives biography

1973 births
Living people
20th-century Dutch civil servants
21st-century Dutch lawyers
21st-century Dutch politicians
21st-century Dutch women politicians
21st-century women lawyers
Dutch women lawyers
Members of the House of Representatives (Netherlands)
Party for Freedom politicians
People from Venlo
Radboud University Nijmegen alumni